The 1924 Lewes by-election was held on 9 July 1924.  The by-election was held due to the appointment as Governor of Western Australia of the incumbent Conservative MP, William Campion.  It was won by the Conservative candidate Tufton Beamish.

References

1924 in England
Lewes
1924 elections in the United Kingdom
By-elections to the Parliament of the United Kingdom in East Sussex constituencies
20th century in Sussex